Marvin Gaye and His Girls is a 1969 compilation album of duets recorded by Marvin Gaye and various female singers on the Tamla label. Among the ladies Gaye sung with were Mary Wells (the hits "Once Upon a Time" and "What's the Matter With You Baby"), Kim Weston ("What Good Am I Without You?" and "It Takes Two") and Tammi Terrell ("Your Precious Love" and "Good Lovin' Ain't Easy to Come By"). It was the original album release of "Good Lovin' Ain't Easy to Come By," which later appeared on Easy. His solo album M.P.G. (named with his initials), was released simultaneously, on Gaye's thirtieth birthday.

Track listing

Credits
Lead (and additional background) vocals by Marvin Gaye, Mary Wells, Kim Weston, and Tammi Terrell
Background vocals by The Love Tones, The Originals, The Spinners, and The Andantes
Instrumentation by The Funk Brothers

References

1969 greatest hits albums
Vocal duet albums
Albums produced by Smokey Robinson
Albums produced by Ashford & Simpson
Albums produced by Clarence Paul
Albums produced by William "Mickey" Stevenson
Marvin Gaye compilation albums
Tamla Records compilation albums